The Finnish National Defence University (MPKK) is a military university located in Helsinki. The university trains officers for the Finnish Defence Forces and the Finnish Border Guard. The main campus is located in Santahamina,  Helsinki.

Prior to 2007, the school referred to itself, in English, as the National Defence College.

History
Initially, it was established to train officers for the Savo Brigade of the Swedish Army, but soon it began to recruit cadets from all of Finland. The school continued operation even after the Finnish War in 1809, where Finland was ceded to the Russian Empire. However, in 1818, a fire broke out in the building, and the school was moved to Hamina to become the Hamina Cadet School.

The Hamina Cadet School was trained officers for the Russian Empire. It was abolished on July 24, 1903 under the influence of various orders given during the first period of repression of Finland by the Russian Empire.

From the beginning of 1993, all of these schools were merged into the National Defence University, one of the largest colleges of higher education for officer education.

Rectors of the National Defense University

Degrees 
It is possible to get the following degrees in the National Defence University:
 Bachelor of military science
 Master of military science
 Senior staff officer's degree
 General staff officer's degree
 Doctor of military science

Departments 
 Department of Leadership and Military Pedagogy
 Department of Warfare
 Department of Military Technology

Locations

Service branch schools 
The following establishments are responsible for the branch- or service-specific education of the students:
 Air Force Academy, Tikkakoski
 Army Academy, Lappeenranta
 Armour School, Hämeenlinna
 Artillery School, Niinisalo
 Engineer School, Lappeenranta
 Infantry School, Lappeenranta
 Signals School, Riihimäki
 Naval Academy, Helsinki
 Border and Coast Guard Academy, Espoo & Imatra (part of Finnish Border Guard)
 Logistics School, Riihimäki (part of Defence Forces Logistics Command)

Besides these, Military Museum of Finland, National Defence Courses departments and the National Defence University Library operate under National Defence University.

References

External links 
 Maanpuolustuskorkeakoulu
 Finnish National Defence University

Education in Helsinki
Universities and colleges in Finland
Educational institutions established in 1993
Military academies of Finland
1993 establishments in Finland